Scud (born 20 March 1967) is the professional name of Guangzhou, China-born Hong Kong film producer, screenwriter and film director, Danny Cheng Wan-Cheung. He says that he chose the name "Scud" to match his Chinese name, which translates in English as "Scudding Clouds". His films explore somewhat taboo themes within Hong Kong cinema, including same-sex relationships and drug-taking. His film-making style eschews cynicism or gritty realism, and embraces an acceptance of the life choices made by his characters, rather than a search for "solutions". Scud has cited Pier Paolo Pasolini, Yukio Mishima, Pedro Almodovar and Peter Greenaway as directors who have influenced his work.

Life and career
Scud was raised by his grandmother in China before he moved to Hong Kong at the age of 13. After a 20-year career in IT, he founded a publicly listed company and acquired a bachelor's degree through part-time study at the Open University of Hong Kong. He moved to Australia in 2001 for permanent residence. In 2005, he returned to Hong Kong to start a film production company, Artwalker. He wrote and produced City Without Baseball (2008), then became a film director for Permanent Residence (2009), which he said was a semi-autobiographical account of his own life, with many scenes and locations providing a faithful account of it, followed by Amphetamine (2010). His fourth is Love Actually... Sucks! (2011), and the fifth, Voyage (2013), which is the first of his stories to be filmed almost entirely in English. The sixth is called Utopians (2015), and the seventh, Thirty Years of Adonis (2017), while Naked Nation, to be filmed mostly in China, awaits release.

In May 2022, Scud told Variety that he plans to retire from filmmaking and leave Hong Kong after finishing two films, Apostles and Bodyshop.

Filmography

Awards
City Without Baseball
 2008 Hong Kong Film Critics Society Awards – Film of Merit Award 
 2008 Hong Kong Film Critics Society Awards – Winner in Top 7 Suggested Films
 2008 Taiwan Film Critics Society Awards – Winner in Top 10 Best Chinese Films

Permanent Residence 
 10th Chinese Film Media Awards – Best New Actor.
 33rd Hong Kong International Film Festival – Official Selection.
 20th Hong Kong Gay and Lesbian Film Festival – Official Selection (Director’s Cut).
 10th Taipei Film Festival – Special Reserved Screening (Director’s Cut).
 25th Torino GLBT Film Festival – Official Selection.

Amphetamine
 2010 Teddy Award Nomination at the Berlin International Film Festival of 2010.
 24th Teddy Award – Runner Up
 34th Hong Kong International Film Festival – Closing Film
 25th Torino GLBT Film Festival – Competition
 46th Chicago International Film Festival – Official Selection
 12th Rio International Film Festival – Official Selection
 30th Hawaii International Film Festival – Official Selection
 30th Hong Kong Film Awards – Best New Actor Nomination

Love Actually…Sucks! 
 47th Chicago International Film Festival – Official Selection
 Philadelphia Q-Fest 2011 – Official Selection

Voyage 
 49th Chicago International Film Festival – Official Selection
 1st Q Hugo Award
 37th São Paulo International Film Festival – Official Selection
 Kyoto International Film and Art Festival 2015 – Special Invitation

Utopians
 2nd New Director Film Festival – Official Selection & Best Foreign Film Director
 27th Palm Springs International Film Festival – Official Selection
 13th Outfest Fusion LGBT People of Color Film Festival – Official Selection
 31st Torino Gay & Lesbian Film Festival – Official Selection
 27th Hong Kong Lesbian & Gay Film Festival – Official Selection
 52nd Chicago International Film Festival – Official Selection
 6th Fringe! Queer Film& Arts fest – Official Selection

See also
 Cinema of Hong Kong

References

External links

 

1967 births
Film directors from Guangdong
Hong Kong film producers
Hong Kong film directors
Chinese LGBT screenwriters
People's Republic of China LGBT people
Hong Kong LGBT screenwriters
Living people
Alumni of Hong Kong Metropolitan University
LGBT film directors
Hong Kong screenwriters
Writers from Guangzhou
Screenwriters from Guangdong